Renato De Maria (born 1958) is an Italian film director and screenwriter. He directed more than ten films since 1991.

Selected filmography

References

External links 

1958 births
Living people
Italian film directors
Italian screenwriters
Italian male screenwriters